John Peterson (born April 18, 1989) is an American professional golfer.
 
Peterson was born in Fort Worth, Texas. He played college golf at Louisiana State University. At LSU, he was a three-time All-American and won twice, including the 2011 NCAA Division I Championship.

Peterson turned professional in 2011. He played in two Nationwide Tour events: The Nationwide Children's Hospital Invitational (T2) and the Children's Hospital Classic (T23) and a number of PGA Tour events through sponsor exemptions.

Peterson qualified for the 2012 U.S. Open through sectional qualifying. In the third round, he was paired with his mentor and fellow LSU alum David Toms, and Peterson also got a hole in one at the par 3 13th hole. He finished the tournament tied for fourth, which earned him exemptions to the 2013 Masters Tournament and U.S. Open.

In 2013, Peterson became the first active Web.com Tour member to compete in the Masters. He earned conditional Web.com Tour status for 2013 based on his 2012 PGA Tour non-member earnings ($327,091), which was equivalent to 172nd on the 2012 PGA Tour money list. He played in the Web.com Tour Finals and finished first to earn a fully exempt PGA Tour card for 2014. He finished seventh in the Web.com Tour Finals to earn his PGA Tour card for the 2014–15 season.

After not regaining his PGA Tour card through the 2018 Web.com Tour Finals, Peterson retired from professional golf. However, he announced his return to golf on April 25, 2019, after watching Tiger Woods and Patrick Cantlay at the Masters.

Amateur wins (2)
2011 NCAA Division I Championship, Jones Cup Invitational

Professional wins (1)
2012 Coca-Cola Walmart Open (Adams Tour)

Results in major championships

CUT = missed the half-way cut
"T" indicates a tie for a place

Results in The Players Championship

"T" indicates a tie for a place

See also
2013 Web.com Tour Finals graduates
2014 Web.com Tour Finals graduates

References

External links

American male golfers
LSU Tigers golfers
PGA Tour golfers
Korn Ferry Tour graduates
Golfers from Texas
Golfers from Louisiana
Sportspeople from Fort Worth, Texas
Sportspeople from Baton Rouge, Louisiana
1989 births
Living people